Victor Gamaldo (born 22 January 1944) is a Trinidad and Tobago former footballer. He played four seasons for the Washington Darts in both the American Soccer League and North American Soccer League. He later played for the Baltimore Bays of the ASL and the Baltimore Comets of the NASL. He also made three appearances for the Trinidad and Tobago national football team.

References

External links
 NASL/ASL stats

1944 births
Living people
Trinidad and Tobago footballers
Trinidad and Tobago expatriate footballers
Trinidad and Tobago international footballers
Association football midfielders
American Soccer League (1933–1983) players
Baltimore Bays (1972–73) players
Baltimore Comets players
Washington Darts players
North American Soccer League (1968–1984) indoor players
North American Soccer League (1968–1984) players
Expatriate soccer players in the United States
Trinidad and Tobago expatriate sportspeople in the United States
Pan American Games medalists in football
Pan American Games bronze medalists for Trinidad and Tobago
Footballers at the 1967 Pan American Games
Medalists at the 1967 Pan American Games